Spyce may refer to:

 Release the Spyce anime
 Spyce (software), similar to PHP for Python
 Spyce Kitchen, an innovative restaurant